The Kerala Gulf diaspora refers to the people of Kerala living in the West Asian Arab states of the Persian Gulf. In 2008, they numbered more than 2.5 million. Nearly 80 percent of Indians living in Kuwait are from Kerala according to the 2008 survey commissioned by the Department of Non-resident Keralite Affairs.

The Gulf Boom 
The "Gulf Boom" refers to the mass migration of a large number of people from the Indian state of Kerala to the GCC states from 1972 to 1983. Largely consisting of the migration of Malayalis, the dominant indigenous ethnic group in Kerala, the movement of many migrant workers from Kerala to the GCC states continues to the present day, although in smaller numbers after the 2008 international financial crisis began to affect the GCC region. This initial wave of migration is usually referred to as the Kerala Gulf Boom. In 2010, the GCC states contained a total Keralite population of more than 3.5 million, who annually sent home a sum of around $6.81 billion (US), which is more than 15.13% of the total Remittance to India in 2008. In 2013 the remittance was more the 60,000 crore (600 billion) rupees.

Background 
Huge oil reserves were discovered in the Eastern Arabia region (Arab states of the Persian Gulf) in the 1930s, with large-scale commercial extraction beginning in the early 1950s. Soon, these countries became major world oil-exporting countries, amassing huge riches within a matter of years, a feat that perhaps has no historical parallel. However, these nations were disadvantaged by small populations and labour forces, with commensurately small skills levels. To meet the challenge they faced, they had to substantially increase immigration at all levels. India, which faced very high unemployment rates, quickly saw the opportunity for its citizens to gain a share of the new work opportunities, with manual workers from Kerala at the forefront. Historical ties and the religious identity of Indian Muslims—many Keralite migrants are Muslim.

Effects of the Gulf Migration on the economy and society of Kerala 
Remittances are a key source of income for Kerala's economy. In 2003 for instance, remittances were 1.74 times the revenue receipts of the state, 7 times the transfers to the state from the Central Government, 1.8 times the annual expenditure of the Kerala Government, and 15 to 18 times the size of foreign exchange earned from the export of cashew and marine products.

Gulf migrants, many of whom were from the working and the lower-middle classes, gradually gained social status. A myth was in the making: that of the 'Gulf man'. Gulf migrants were highly sought after as bridegrooms. Their attractive earnings, irrespective of their shortcomings, enabled them to marry into wealthy and respected families when they returned home.

The Gulf Dream has also found its expression in Malayalam cinema and literature. M. Mukundan's Daivathinte Vikrithikal draws out in detail the socio-economic impacts of Gulf migration on the enclave of Mahe. Pathemari (English: Dhow) is a 2015  Malayalam-language period drama film written and directed by Salim Ahamed whose plot follows the life of Pallikkal Narayanan (Mammootty) who migrated to the Middle-East in the early 1960s, when the Kerala Gulf boom was just beginning.

Notable personalities 

M. A. Yousuf Ali - Retail & Money Exchange - Lulu Group of companies
Joy Alukkas - Jewellery, Fashion & Lifestyle, Money Exchange - Joyalukkas Group
B. Ravi Pillai - Diversified - RP Group
Azad Moopen - Healthcare - Aster DM Healthcare
R.Harikumar  - Aluminium Extrusion - Elite Group
P. Mohamed Ali - Construction & Oilfield Supplies -Galfar Engineering and Contracting SAOG
P. V. Abdul Wahab - Diversified - Peevees & Bridgeway Group
Shamsheer Vayalil - Healthcare - VPS Healthcare
P. N. C. Menon - Construction - Sobha Ltd.
Sunny Varkey - Education - GEMS

See also 
 Department of Non Resident Keralites Affairs
 World Malayalee Council
 Migrant labourers in Kerala
 Economy of Kerala
 Unemployment in Kerala

References

External links 
 

History of Kerala (1947–present)
Economy of Kerala
Ethnic groups in the Middle East
 
Indian diaspora
Demographic history of India